Albert Goodwin (2 August 1906 – 22 September 1995) was a Fellow of Jesus College, Oxford (where he had previously been a student) and later Professor of Modern History in the University of Manchester. In his book of the same name, he presented his liberal interpretation of the French Revolution as 'a merciless conflict between aristocracy and democracy' caused by the refusal of Louis XVI to accept the role of a constitutional monarch.

Life and career 
Goodwin was born in Sheffield and educated at King Edward VII School, winning a scholarship to Jesus College, Oxford in 1924. After completing his studies he became a Laming Travelling Fellow of Queen's College, Oxford which enabled him to pursue graduate studies at the Sorbonne in Paris in 1928–1929. His first teaching post was as Assistant Lecturer in European History at Liverpool University from 1929 through 1931. He left that position to join the staff of Jesus College, Oxford where he held a variety of posts from 1931 through 1939, including Junior Dean, Librarian, and Dean of Degrees.

During World War II, Goodwin served as an officer in the Royal Air Force. He returned to academic life at Jesus College, Oxford after the war, serving as Senior Tutor in 1947-1948 and then Vice- Principal from 1949 through 1955. In 1953 he succeeded Lewis Namier as Professor of Modern History at Manchester University; a post he remained in through 1969. In 1969 and 1970  he was a visiting fellow at All Souls College, Oxford.

Books
 The Federalist Movement in Caen during the French Revolution. 1960 (paperback)
 The French Revolution. 1953; 2nd ed 1966
 The European nobility in the eighteenth century; studies of the nobilities of the major European states in the pre-Reform era. 1954; 2nd ed 1967
 Counter-revolution in Brittany : The royalist conspiracy of the Marquis de la Rouerie, 1791-3. 1957 
 (with J.S. Bromley) Select list of works on Europe and Europe overseas, 1715–1815. Edited for the Oxford Eighteenth Century Group. 1974
 The Friends of liberty : The English democratic movement in the age of the French Revolution. 1979

References

1906 births
1995 deaths
Alumni of Jesus College, Oxford
Fellows of Jesus College, Oxford
Academics of the Victoria University of Manchester
Historians of the French Revolution
People educated at King Edward VII School, Sheffield
20th-century British historians